Cute High Earth Defense Club Love! is an anime television series by Diomedéa, directed by Shinji Takamatsu and written by Michiko Yokote. The series is a parody of the magical girl genre, in which five male students are chosen to become the magical Battle Lovers in order to protect the Earth from evil monsters. The series aired in Japan between January 6, 2015 and March 24, 2015 and was simulcast by Crunchyroll and Funimation. The series was licensed in North America by Ponycan USA, who began releasing the series on Blu-ray Disc and DVD in August 2015.

A second season, title Cute High Earth Defense Club Love! Love!, began airing in Japan from July 7, 2016 to September 27, 2016.

Episode list

Cute High Earth Defense Club Love! (2015)

Cute High Earth Defense Club Love! Love! (2016)

Cute High Earth Defense Club HAPPY KISS! (2018)

References

Cute High Earth Defense Club Love!